Hanno (c. 1510 – 8 June 1516) was the pet white elephant given by King Manuel I of Portugal to Pope Leo X (born Giovanni de' Medici) at his coronation. Hanno, an Asian elephant, came to Rome in 1514 with the Portuguese ambassador Tristão da Cunha and quickly became the Pope's favorite animal. Hanno died two years later from complications of a treatment for constipation with gold-enriched laxative.

Background
King Manuel had either received him as a gift from the Raja of Cochin, or had asked Afonso de Albuquerque, his viceroy in India, to purchase him. Hanno was said to be white in colour, and arrived by ship from Lisbon to Rome in 1514, aged about four years, and was kept initially in an enclosure in the Belvedere courtyard, then moved to a specially constructed building between St. Peter's Basilica and the Apostolic Palace, near the Borgo Sant'Angelo (a road in the rione of Borgo). His arrival was commemorated in poetry and art. Pasquale Malaspina wrote:

Hanno became a great favourite of the papal court and was featured in processions. Two years after he came to Rome, he fell ill suddenly, was given a purgative, and died on 8 June 1516, with the pope at his side. Hanno was interred in the Cortile del Belvedere at the age of seven.

The artist Raphael designed a memorial fresco (which does not survive), and the Pope himself composed the epitaph:

Hanno was also the subject of a satirical pamphlet by Pietro Aretino titled "The Last Will and Testament of the Elephant Hanno." The fictitious will cleverly mocked the leading political and religious figures of Rome at the time, including Pope Leo X himself. The pamphlet was such a success that it kickstarted Aretino's career and established him as a famous satirist, ultimately known as "the Scourge of Princes".

There are four sketches of Hanno, done in life with red chalk, in the collection of the Ashmolean Museum at Oxford.

Cultural references
Hanno's story is told at length in Silvio Bedini's book, The Pope's Elephant.  According to Robert Greene, Aretino's audacious satire catapulted him to fame and, such was Leo's amusement, earned him a post in the papal service.

See also

List of historical elephants
History of elephants in Europe
Hansken
Abul-Abbas
Dürer's Rhinoceros

References

Further reading 

Silvio A. Bedini, The Pope's Elephant, Carcanet Press, 1997, 
Robert Greene, The 48 Laws of Power, Viking Penguin, 1998, 
Annemarie Jordan Gschwend, The Story of Süleyman: Celebrity Elephants and Other Exotica in Renaissance Portugal, Pacyderm, 2010, 
José Saramago, The Elephant's Journey, Mariner Books, 2008, 

16th-century individual animals
1516
Individual elephants
Individual animals in India
Elephants in India
Pope Leo X
Animals as diplomatic gifts
Individual animals in Italy